The 1997–1998 international cricket season was from September 1997 to April 1998.

Season overview

September

New Zealand in Zimbabwe

India in Pakistan

October

South Africa in Pakistan

President's Cup 1997-98

November

Wills Quadrangular Tournament 1997-98

New Zealand in Australia

West Indies in Pakistan

Sri Lanka in India

December

Carlton and United Series 1997–98

Akai-Singer Champions Trophy 1997-98

South Africa in Australia

January

Silver Jubilee Independence Cup 1997-98

Zimbabwe in Sri Lanka

England in the West Indies

February

Zimbabwe in New Zealand

Australia in New Zealand

Pakistan in South Africa

March

Australia in India

Pakistan in Zimbabwe

Sri Lanka in South Africa

April

Pepsi Triangular Series 1997-98

Standard Bank International One-Day Series 1997–98

Coca-Cola Cup 1997–98

References

 
1997 in cricket
1998 in cricket